Earl Ligonier was a title that was created twice in British history, once in the Peerage of Great Britain and once in the Peerage of Ireland. The first creation came in the Peerage of Great Britain on 10 September 1766 in favour of the French-born soldier Field Marshal John Ligonier. The peerage was created with normal remainder to the heirs male of his body. He had already been created Viscount Ligonier, of Enniskillen, in the Peerage of Ireland on 31 December 1757, with normal remainder to the heirs male of his body, and Viscount Ligonier, of Clonmell, in the Peerage of Ireland on 20 May 1762, with remainder to his nephew, Edward Ligonier. In 1763 he was also created Lord Ligonier, Baron of Ripley, in the County of Surrey, in the Peerage of Great Britain, with normal remainder to the heirs male of his body. The barony, viscountcy of 1757 and earldom became extinct on his death on 28 April 1770 while he was succeeded in the viscountcy of 1762 according to the special remainder by his nephew, the second Viscount. Edward Ligonier was the illegitimate son of Colonel Francis Augustus Ligonier, brother of the first Earl. On 19 July 1776 the earldom was revived when he was made Earl Ligonier, of Clonmell in the County of Tipperary, in the Peerage of Ireland. The titles became extinct on his death on 14 June 1782.

Earls Ligonier; First creation (1766)
John Louis Ligonier, 1st Earl Ligonier (1680–1770)

Viscounts Ligonier (1762)
John Louis Ligonier, 1st Earl Ligonier, 1st Viscount Ligonier (1680–1770) 
Edward Ligonier, 2nd Viscount Ligonier (1740–1782) (created Earl Ligonier in 1776)

Earls Ligonier; Second creation (1776)
Edward Ligonier, 1st Earl Ligonier (1740–1782)

References

Extinct earldoms in the Peerage of Great Britain
Extinct earldoms in the Peerage of Ireland
Noble titles created in 1766
Noble titles created in 1776